Jenny Carlson (born 17 April 1995) is a Swedish handball player who plays for Brest Bretagne Handball and the Swedish national team.

She has previously played for Lugi HF in Sweden, Ringkøbing Håndbold, EH Aalborg and Holstebro Håndbold in Danish Handball League. In February 2022 it was announced she’d played her last game for Holstebro, and on 1 March it was announced she’d join Brest Bretagne with immediate effect.

She represented Sweden at the 2020 Summer Olympics.

Achievements

Club

Domestic 

 French league (Division 1 Féminine):
 Runner up: 2022 (with Brest Bretagne Handball)

National team 

 Olympic Games
 2020: 4th

 World Championship:
 2021: 5th

 European Championship
 2022: 5th

References

1995 births
Living people
Handball players from Gothenburg
Swedish female handball players
Handball players at the 2020 Summer Olympics  
Olympic handball players of Sweden
21st-century Swedish women